Antsahamena is a commune in northern Madagascar. It belongs to the district of Andapa, which is a part of Sava Region. According to 2001 census the population of Antsahamena was 3,418.

Only primary schooling is available in town. The majority 99.5% of the population are farmers.  The most important crops are rice and vanilla; also coffee is an important agricultural product. Services provide employment for 0.5% of the population.

References and notes 

Populated places in Sava Region